The 1983 Australian federal election was held in Australia on 5 March 1983. All 125 seats in the House of Representatives and all 64 seats in the Senate were up for election, following a double dissolution. The incumbent Coalition government which had been in power since 1975, led by Malcolm Fraser (Liberal Party) and Doug Anthony (National Party), was defeated in a landslide by the opposition Labor Party led by Bob Hawke. 

This election marked the end of the seven year Liberal-National Coalition Fraser Government and the start of the 13 year Hawke-Keating Labor Government. The Coalition would spend its longest ever period in opposition and the Labor party would spend its longest ever period of government at a federal level. The Coalition would not return to government until the 1996 election.

Background and issues
At the time of the election, the economy suffered from high inflation and high unemployment, alongside increases in industrial disputation and drought across much of the rural areas. The coalition government was led by Prime Minister Malcolm Fraser since 1975. Fraser had fought off a leadership challenge from Andrew Peacock, who had resigned from the Cabinet citing Fraser's "manic determination to get his own way", a phrase Fraser had himself used when he resigned from John Gorton's Government in 1971. The Liberal government had to contend with the early-1980s recession. They unexpectedly won the December 1982 Flinders by-election, after having lost the March 1982 Lowe by-election with a large swing.

Hawke had entered Parliament at the 1980 federal election following a decade as leader of the Australian Council of Trade Unions (ACTU). Labor factions began to push for the deposition of Bill Hayden from the party leadership in favour of Hawke.  Fraser was well aware of the ructions in Labor, and originally planned to call an election for 1982, more than a year before it was due. However, he was forced to scrap those plans after suffering a severe back injury.

On 3 February 1983 at a meeting in Brisbane held in conjunction with the state funeral of former Labor Prime Minister Frank Forde, Hayden resigned on the advice of his closest supporters such as Senator John Button. An election wasn't due for seven more months; however, Fraser, emboldened by the unexpected retention of Flinders, had caught wind of the impending change and attempted to immediately call an election (for 5 March), which would have put Parliament into "caretaker mode" and essentially frozen Labor into contesting the election with Hayden as leader. 

However, Fraser could not secure a swift dissolution of parliament as paperwork for the double dissolution had to be prepared, delaying the official proclamation by Governor-General, Sir Ninian Stephen by a few hours. Fraser had hoped to do this before the announcement of the change in Labor leadership, and was now stuck with the prospect of a party now led by the more popular Hawke.  

Richard de Crespigny (future Captain of Qantas flight 32 which was crippled on a flight from Singapore to Sydney), who was serving at this time as aide de camp to Governor-General Stephen, details this event in his book. The actual double dissolution of the parliament occurred the following day on 4 February.  Fraser also hoped to gain control of the Senate, where the Australian Democrats had held the balance of power since 1 July 1981.

Five days later on 8 February, the ALP formally elected Hawke as party leader.  Fraser was intensely unpopular at the time, and in response to his abrupt removal, Hayden made his famous claim that a "drover's dog" could lead the ALP to victory. Fraser's campaign used the slogan "We're Not Waiting for the World", while Hawke's campaign theme was based around his favoured leadership philosophy of consensus, using the slogan "Bringing Australia Together". 

The Ash Wednesday bushfires that devastated areas of Victoria and South Australia on 16 February disrupted the Prime Minister's re-election campaign which was unofficially put on hold while he toured the affected areas. 

Fraser tried to brand Hawke as a union organiser as being friendly towards Communism. On the security of the banking system to protect people's savings, he asserted that ordinary people's money was safer under their beds than in a bank under Labor.  In response to an attack,  Hawke laughed and said "you can't keep your money under the bed because that's where the Commies are!"

As counting progressed on election night, it was obvious early on that the ALP had won with a massive swing.  Hawke with wife Hazel claimed victory and a tearful Fraser conceded defeat. Ultimately, Labor achieved a 24-seat swing —- the largest defeat of a sitting government since 1949 and the worst defeat a sitting non-Labor government has ever suffered.  Fraser soon resigned from Parliament, leaving the Liberal leadership to his long-term foe Andrew Peacock, who would later have a fierce leadership battle himself with the future Liberal Prime Minister John Howard. 

The Labor Party would spend 13 years in government, with both Hawke and Paul Keating as leaders -- the longest period of continuous federal government in the party's history.

Voting intention

Results

House of Representatives

Senate

Notes
In New South Wales and Victoria, the coalition parties ran a joint ticket. Of the eight senators elected on a joint ticket, seven were members of the Liberal Party and one was a member of the National Party. In Queensland, South Australia, and Western Australia, the coalition parties ran on separate tickets. In the ACT and Tasmania, only the Liberal Party ran a ticket. In the Northern Territory, only the Country Liberal Party ran a ticket.
The sole independent elected was Brian Harradine of Tasmania.

Seats changing hands

 Members listed in italics did not contest their seat at this election.

See also
 Candidates of the Australian federal election, 1983
 Members of the Australian House of Representatives, 1983–1984
 Members of the Australian Senate, 1983–1985

Notes 
 Prior to 1984 the AEC did not undertake a full distribution of preferences for statistical purposes. The stored ballot papers for the 1983 election were put through this process prior to their destruction. Therefore, the figures from 1983 onwards show the actual result based on full distribution of preferences. The 1983 swing of approximately 3.6 points is based on a pure deduction of one result from the other.

References

External links 
 University of WA  election results in Australia since 1890
 AustralianPolitics.com election details
 AEC 2PP vote

1983 elections in Australia
Federal elections in Australia
Bob Hawke
Malcolm Fraser
March 1983 events in Australia
Landslide victories